David Oh (Korean name: Oh Se-hun; Hangul: 오세훈; born June 29, 1991) is an American singer based in South Korea. He competed in the 2010 MBC reality television series The Great Birth, placing in the top five. He subsequently was a cast member on the 2011 variety show We Got Married, appearing alongside the singer RiSe. He released his first extended play, Skinships, in 2016.

Discography

Extended plays

Singles

References

External links
 
 

1991 births
Living people
American K-pop singers
Korean-language singers of the United States
South Korean television personalities
South Korean male singers
South Korean pop singers
American male pop singers
American television personalities
Male television personalities
American musicians of Korean descent
21st-century American singers
21st-century South Korean singers
21st-century American male singers